The Vallorbe–Le Brassus railway line is a standard gauge railway line in southwestern Switzerland. It shares the section between Vallorbe and Le Day with the Simplon line. Originally built by the Pont–Vallorbe Railway and Pont–Brassus Railway between 1886 and 1899, it is now owned by Swiss Federal Railways and Travys, with Travys operating passenger services over the entire route.

History 

Jura–Simplon Railways acquired the Pont–Vallorbe Railway on 1 January 1891. Jura–Simplon Railways was one of several Swiss companies nationalized in 1902, becoming part of Swiss Federal Railways. The Pont–Brassus Railway was not included, and remained independent until merging with the Yverdon–Ste-Croix Railway in 2001 to form Travys.

The line was electrified at 15 kV/16.7 Hz AC on 2 October 1938.

Notes

References

External links 
 
 2021 timetable

Railway lines in Switzerland
Railway lines opened in 1886
15 kV AC railway electrification